Gorna Vasilitsa is a village in Sofia Province in southwestern Bulgaria, located in the Kostenets Municipality. As of the 2010 census, the village had a total population of 273. The settlement contains many villa-type properties used as holiday homes and weekend getaways. An increasing number of foreigners are finding that house prices here are well below those in other "sun-trap" countries of southern Europe.

Location

History

Religion

Bulgarian Eastern Orthodox is the predominant religion.

Climate

Landmarks

Events

“Surva”
Conducted in the last three days of January.

Gallery 

Villages in Sofia Province